Jeanne de Coëme, Dame de Lucé and de Bonnétable (1555–1601) was a French noble and courtier. She was the daughter of Louis de Coesme and a member of the House of Bourbon. She married François de Bourbon, titled the Prince of Conti. As such, after her marriage she was the Princess of Conti.

Biography
Jeanne was born in 1555. Her father Louis de Coesme was the Seigneur of Lucé. Her mother Anne de Pisseleu was the niece of Anne de Pisseleu, Duchess of Étampes, the celebrated mistress of Francis I of France. Jeanne was the heiress of Bonnétable, a commune in the Sarthe department in the region of Pays de la Loire in north-western France.

Her first marriage, in January 1576, was with Louis de Montafié, Count of Montafié, Lord of Piedmont, Prince of Carignano. Together they had one son and two daughters, including Anne de Montafié born on July 21, 1577. On October 6, 1577, when Anne was less than three months old, her father was assassinated at Aix-en-Provence while in the service of King Henry III of France as his lieutenant. Her mother required the intervention of the King and Pope Pius V to ensure that she regained the succession to her father's estate of Bonnétable.

On December 17, 1581, Jeanne de Coesme married a second time, to François de Bourbon, Prince of Conti at the Palais du Louvre. In 1585, Nicolas de Montreux dedicated the first edition of the first volume of his novel the Bergeries de Julliette to her. The letters written by Jeanne during the 1580s and 1590s provide historians with an insight into the state of affairs in the province of Maine at that period.  Jeanne died in 1601 and had no children with François.

Jeanne's daughter, Anne de Montafié became the Countess of Soissons after marrying Charles de Bourbon, Count of Soissons on December 27, 1601.  In this marriage, Anne brought her inheritance of the countship of Montafié in Piedmont as well as her mother's seigneuries of Bonnétable and Lucé to the Bourbons. Sadly, her mother had contracted smallpox while travelling to her estate at Lucé to negotiate Anne's marriage, and died at Saint-Arnoul, near Chartres, the day before Anne's wedding.

References 

1555 births
1601 deaths
16th-century French women
17th-century French women
French nobility
House of Bourbon
Princesses by marriage
Princesses of Conti
Princesses of the Blood
French letter writers
Women letter writers
Household of Catherine de' Medici